Sir Alexander Paul Beresford (born 6 April 1946) is a British-New Zealand dentist and politician who has served as the British Conservative Party Member of Parliament (MP) for Mole Valley in Surrey since the 1997 general election. He was first elected as the MP for Croydon Central in the 1992 general election.

Early life

Beresford was born in 1946 in Levin in the Horowhenua District of Manawatū-Whanganui, New Zealand. He moved to Nelson at a young age, where he lived in Richmond; he attended primary school and Waimea College in Richmond before attending the University of Otago in Dunedin. He is a practising dentist. Beresford holds dual British and New Zealand citizenship.

Career in local government

Beresford was elected as a Councillor to Wandsworth Borough Council in 1978, and was its Leader between 1983 and 1992, through much of the Thatcher Government. He was knighted in the 1990 New Year Honours for political and public service.

Parliamentary career

Beresford was selected to fight the safe Conservative seat of Croydon Central following the retirement of former Cabinet minister John Moore. Beresford was elected at the 1992 general election and made his maiden speech on 30 June 1992. He entered the Major Government in 1994 as the Parliamentary Under Secretary of State at the Department for the Environment and remained until the Government was defeated in 1997.

When the number of seats in Croydon was reduced from four to three before the 1997 general election, he failed to be selected for the newly drawn Croydon Central, and instead fought the safe Conservative Mole Valley seat in Surrey, where Kenneth Baker was retiring, and he was elected at the 1997 election. Croydon Central fell to Labour. Prior to the 2010 general election Beresford was a member of the Communities & Local Government Select committee. In 2012, Beresford was named by the Conservative Home website as one of a minority of loyal Conservative backbench MPs not to have voted against the government in any significant rebellions.

Beresford campaigned for a Remain vote during the 2016 referendum on EU membership.

Since 1997 Beresford, while serving as a backbencher, has been successful in utilising Private Members Bills and carefully chosen amendments to government legislation to achieve over ten legal changes which the BBC's Mark D'Arcy described as collectively having '...a significant impact'. These primarily but not exclusively focussed on child protection, an issue Beresford has campaigned on for decades.

In 2021 Beresford introduced a further Private Members Bill – the Local Government (Disqualification) Bill – intended to prevent individuals who have been given non custodial sentences for sexual offences from sitting as local councillors or mayors. This Bill received the backing of the government and completed successful passage through the Commons in January 2022. It subsequently passed through the House of Lords and received Royal Assent in April 2022.

In July 2022, during the political crisis caused by the Pincher Scandal, Beresford announced that he had lost confidence in Prime Minister Boris Johnson and felt he should resign. Beresford went on to back Rishi Sunak in both the first and second Conservative Party leadership contests of 2022.

Beresford announced in early 2023 that he would step down at the next general election.

Electoral history

Elections in the 2010s

Elections in the 2000s

Elections in the 1990s
This constituency underwent boundary changes between the 1992 and 1997 general elections and thus change in share of vote is based on a notional calculation.

Expenses

During the media coverage of the United Kingdom parliamentary expenses scandal, it was revealed that Beresford, who is a practising dentist, designated his west London property (which includes his dental surgery) as his second home, allowing him to claim allowances of three-quarters of the running costs of the property from the taxpayer.

Personal life
Beresford has a son from his previous marriage who lives in New Zealand. He and his present wife Julie have two sons and one daughter.

References

External links
 Sir Paul Beresford Conservative Party
 Mole Valley Conservatives
 Your representatives – Paul Beresford  BBC Democracy Live

News items

 MP fears 'truckloads of waste' BBC News, 7 December 2006 – Concern over an incinerator in Surrey

Conservative Party (UK) MPs for English constituencies
UK MPs 1992–1997
UK MPs 1997–2001
UK MPs 2001–2005
UK MPs 2005–2010
UK MPs 2010–2015
UK MPs 2015–2017
UK MPs 2017–2019
UK MPs 2019–present
Politics of the London Borough of Croydon
British dentists
1946 births
Living people
People from Levin, New Zealand
Councillors in the London Borough of Wandsworth
New Zealand Knights Bachelor
New Zealand knights
Politicians awarded knighthoods
University of Otago alumni
People educated at Waimea College
New Zealand emigrants to England
New Zealand expatriates in England